The 2012 Bank of the West Classic was a professional tennis tournament played on hard courts. It was the 41st edition of the tournament which was part of the WTA Premier tournaments category of the 2012 WTA Tour. It took place in Stanford, United States, on July 9–15, 2012. It was the first event of the 2012 US Open Series.

Singles entrants

Seeds 

 1 Rankings as of June 25, 2012

Other entrants 
The following players received wildcards into the singles main draw:
  Mallory Burdette
  Nicole Gibbs
  Michelle Larcher de Brito

The following players received entry from the qualifying draw:
  Jana Juricová
  Noppawan Lertcheewakarn
  Grace Min
  Erika Sema

The following players received entry into the singles main draw as lucky losers:
  Alexa Glatch
  Coco Vandeweghe
  Zheng Saisai

Withdrawals 
  Stéphanie Dubois (foot injury)
  Daniela Hantuchová
  Petra Martić
  Christina McHale
  Bojana Jovanovski
  Angelique Kerber
  Nadia Petrova
  Peng Shuai

Retirements 
  Ayumi Morita (low back injury)

Doubles entrants

Seeds 

1 Rankings as of June 25, 2012

Other entrants 
The following pairs received wildcards into the doubles main draw:
  Mallory Burdette /  Nicole Gibbs
  Simone Kalhorn /  Alessondra Parra

Retirements 
  Urszula Radwańska (heat illness)

Finals

Singles 

  Serena Williams defeated  Coco Vandeweghe 7–5, 6–3

Doubles 

  Marina Erakovic /  Heather Watson defeated  Jarmila Gajdošová /  Vania King 7–5, 7–6(9–7)

External links 
 

2012 WTA Tour
2012
2012 in sports in California